Govan  is a town in the province of Saskatchewan, Canada located 111 kilometres north of Regina on Highway 20. In 2011 the town had 216 residents.

History
The first settlers made their homes along the shores of Long Lake (now known as Last Mountain Lake), at places close to McKillops's Landing, Arlington Beach, and Taylorboro. The original settlers used the waters of Last Mountain Lake, which is 93 kilometres long, as a means of transportation. Supplies for the farmers were brought north up the lake and grain was taken down the lake in boats, then stored in elevators at the East End. This lake transportation system was abandoned when the early extension of the Canadian Pacific Railway Kirkella branch from Bulyea to Lanigan and on to Saskatoon was built, opening up more of the country to the settlers.

The first house to be built within a five-mile radius of Govan was erected in 1903 by Oscar Landstrom, on the southeast quarter of Section 32, Township 27, Range 22 west of the second meridian.

Some of the settlers came north from Craven, through Bulyea and Strasbourg districts. Others came up the waters on Long Lake.

Demographics 

Sports
A men's senior ice hockey team from Govan was one of five founding teams in 1965 of the Highway Hockey League in central Saskatchewan.

See also
 List of communities in Saskatchewan
 List of towns in Saskatchewan

References

External links

Last Mountain Valley No. 250, Saskatchewan
Towns in Saskatchewan
Division No. 11, Saskatchewan